Touch Up is Mother Mother's debut album released on February 27, 2007, on Last Gang Records. The album was self-titled when it was originally released in 2005. Two tracks were added when the band signed with Last Gang Records and the album was re-released in 2007. A video has been made for the song "Touch Up".

Track listing

Personnel

Mother Mother
 Ryan Guldemond – vocals, guitar, percussion, synthesizer
 Molly Guldemond – vocals
 Debra-Jean Creelman – vocals
 Jeremy Page – bass, alto sax, tenor sax
 Kenton Loewen – drums

Additional Personnel
 Phil Comparelli – trumpet
 Kurt Dahle – drums
 David Spidel – bass, double bass
 Howard Redekopp – bass

Production
 Mother Mother – audio Production, composer
 Howard Redekopp – producer, engineer, mixer
 Craig Waddell – mastering
 Shawn Penner – engineer
 Molly Guldemond – artwork
 Jeremy Page – artwork, design

References

Mother Mother albums
2007 albums